Mygdonia was a district of ancient Macedon.
 Mygdonia (bug) is also a genus of bugs in the tribe Mictini.

Mygdonia can also refer to:
Mygdonia (Thrace), a town of ancient Thrace
Antiochia Mygdonia, a Seleucid colony in ancient Mesopotamia
Mygdonia, Thessaloniki, a municipality near Thessaloniki, Greece
Mygdonia A.C., a badminton club, Drimos, Thessaloniki, Greece

See also
Mygdonius, ancient Greek name for the Jaghjagh River